Tilman Frasch is a historian working at Manchester Metropolitan University. He studies Burmese historical sources of the Pagan period.  Frasch received his PhD in Heidelberg in 1994 with a work about the Pagan kingdom, titled Pagan: Stadt und Staat.

In 2015, Frasch identified Nissaya documents in the Trafford Council archive.

Works

Frasch, Tilman (1996). Pagan: Stadt und Staat. Stuttgart: F. Steiner.
Frasch, Tilman (1998). "The Mt. Thetso Inscription Re-examined." Myanmar Historical Research Journal 2: 109-126
Frasch, Tilman (1998). "King Nadaungmya's Great Gift". Études Birmanes en hommage à Denise Bernot. Pierre Pichard and François Robinne, eds.  (Études thematiques 9). Paris: École française d'Extrême-Orient: 27–35.
Frasch, Tilman (2002). "Coastal Peripheries during the Pagan Period," in Jos Gommans/Jacques Leider (eds.), The Maritime Frontier of Burma. Exploring Political, Cultural and Commercial Interaction in the Indian Ocean World, 1200-1800, Amsterdam: KITLV Press: 59-78
Frasch, Tilman (2004). "Notes on Dipavamsa: An Early Publication by U Pe Maung Tin". The Journal of Burma Studies, NIU.
Frasch, Tilman (2005). "Inscriptions of Bagan, edited and translated," in Essays in Commemoration of the Golden Jubilee of the Myanmar Historical Commission, ed. by Ministry of Education, Yangon: 134-148
Frasch, Tilman (2008). "Measuring Burmese Soil: Some Unknown Words and Practices," in Pierre Le Roux et al. (eds.), Poids et mesures en Asie du Sud-est'', vol. 2, Paris: l'Ecole Française d'Extrème Orient : 625–633.

References 

Burmese studies scholars
Living people
Year of birth missing (living people)